The statue of St. Petronius (1494–1495) was created by Michelangelo out of marble. Its height is 64 cm. It is situated in the Basilica of San Domenico, Bologna. Its subject is Saint Petronius, bishop of Bologna.

See also
List of works by Michelangelo

External links

Sculptures by Michelangelo
1495 sculptures
Marble sculptures in Italy